Robert Carlo Mariano (born December 25, 1975), known by the nickname Boston Rob, is an American television personality, known for appearing in the CBS reality show Survivor. He placed 10th in the show's 4th season Survivor: Marquesas, finished as the runner up to his eventual wife Amber Brkich in the show's 8th season Survivor: All-Stars, came in 13th place in the show's 20th season Survivor: Heroes vs. Villains, won the show's 22nd season Survivor: Redemption Island, returned for the show's 39th season Survivor: Island of the Idols as a mentor for the new players alongside Sandra Diaz-Twine, and came in 17th place in the show's 40th season Survivor: Winners at War. He is the first contestant to appear on Survivor 6 times, and play 5 times. He also competed on The Amazing Race twice alongside his wife, where they placed 2nd and 8th.

Personal life 
Mariano was born in Hyde Park, Boston, Massachusetts, and raised in Canton, Massachusetts. He is of Italian descent. He graduated from Xaverian Brothers High School in 1994, where he played golf and hockey. In 1999, Mariano graduated with a Bachelor of Arts degree in psychology from Boston University. He made the BU hockey team in 1995 as a freshman, however he declined to play for coach Jack Parker after he was told that he would not receive much ice time. At the time he first played Survivor in 2001, he was 25 years old and continuing to coach the hockey team.

Mariano began a relationship with fellow reality TV contestant Amber Brkich in 2003, during their time filming Survivor: All-Stars. They became engaged on May 9, 2004, during the show's live finale at Madison Square Garden in New York City, and married on April 16, 2005 at Atlantis Paradise Island in The Bahamas. CBS aired a two-hour special about the wedding, entitled Rob and Amber Get Married, on May 24, 2005. After their marriage, Brkich took Mariano's surname, and the couple moved to Pensacola, Florida. They have four daughters: Lucia Rose (born July 4, 2009), Carina Rose (born December 10, 2010), Isabetta Rose (born May 5, 2012), and Adelina Rose (born June 20, 2014). Their entire family are members of the Catholic Church.

Mariano is a well-known fan of the Boston Red Sox, Boston Bruins, Boston Celtics, and the New England Patriots.

Survivor

Marquesas 

Assigned to the Maraamu tribe at the start of the game, Mariano was successful in leading a counter alliance against Hunter Ellis though as a result of this their challenge performance was lackluster compared to the opposing tribe. In the fourth episode, "The Winds Twist", Mariano was swapped into the minority on his new tribe, Rotu, though was spared when Gabriel Cade's apathetic nature to the game was seen as detrimental. When the tribes merged, Mariano was viewed as the biggest target by the original Rotu tribe members and attempted to counter by warning of a splinter group of John Carroll, Tammy Leitner, Zoe Zanidakis, and Robert DeCanio though this proved unsuccessful and was voted out in a 7-2-1 vote.

All-Stars 

Mariano was announced to compete in Survivor: All-Stars after his prior performance in Survivor: Marquesas. Assigned to the Chapera tribe, Mariano formed an immediate alliance with Amber Brkich and successfully navigated the game together through brokering deals with contestants that would not be honored and securing an alliance with Jenna Lewis and Rupert Boneham to eliminate bigger targets. Upon reaching the final tribal council, Mariano was lambasted for abusing his relationships with contestants outside of the game to benefit himself though was praised for his aggressive gameplay. On May 9, 2004, before the votes were announced, Mariano proposed to Brkich which she accepted. Mariano lost the season in a 4–3 vote.

Heroes vs. Villains 

For his actions in Survivor: All-Stars, Mariano was announced as a contestant for Survivor: Heroes vs. Villains. Assigned to the Villains tribe, Mariano was the de facto leader of the Villains with his storyline focused on his rivalry with Russell Hantz and their differing views of the game. In the sixth episode, "Banana Etiquette", Mariano and his alliance planned to split the vote between Hantz and Parvati Shallow to eliminate either target and a hidden immunity idol, but their plan was thwarted when Tyson Apostol changed his vote, leading to Apostol's elimination. In the seventh episode, "I'm Not A Good Villain", with Mariano now in the minority of his tribe, he appealed to Benjamin "Coach" Wade's sense of honesty and integrity to vote Hantz. Coach was divided between his allegiances to both Mariano and Hantz but ultimately sided against Mariano, and Mariano was voted out.

Redemption Island 

On January 13, 2011, Mariano was announced to compete in his fourth season, Survivor: Redemption Island in a continuation of his feud in Heroes vs Villains with Russell Hantz. Mariano, through his hard work ethic and likeability from his new tribe, became the de facto leader. As a result of this, he formed a majority alliance with Andrea Boehlke, Grant Mattos, Natalie Tenerelli, Matt Elrod, and Ashley Underwood. As the game progressed, Mariano successfully eliminated opponents with relative ease and formed an alliance with outsider Phillip Sheppard due to his abrasive and unpredictable nature. Using his past experiences and ability to read his fellow players, Mariano controlled every vote he was involved in and was able to reach the final tribal council where he was praised for his dominant game over finalists Sheppard and Tenerelli who attributed their success to Mariano. On May 15, 2011, Mariano was revealed to have won the season in an 8-1-0 vote. Whilst viewers and fans were critical of his win, Jeff Probst characterized Mariano's game as the "most perfect game of Survivor ever".

Island of the Idols 

Mariano, along with former castmate Sandra Diaz-Twine, returned for the 39th season in a mentor role for a new group of castaways. Unable to vote or compete in challenges, Mariano and Diaz-Twine lived together on a separate beach from the game and, at times, have one player visit to be taught a lesson on the various facets of Survivor. In addition, they would attend each Tribal Council in a hideaway. On the morning of Day 37, Mariano and Diaz-Twine departed from the eponymous Island of the Idols leaving a luxurious shelter and supplies for the final five castaways of the season.

Winners at War 

At the finale of Survivor: Island of the Idols, it was announced that Mariano would be competing alongside 19 other winners of the show, including Brkich. He was placed on the Sele tribe where he quickly formed an "Old-School" Alliance with Parvati Shallow and Ethan Zohn, although the alliance ultimately fell apart due to Danni Boatwright informing Ben Driebergen of its existence. Mariano was later swapped to the Yara tribe with Driebergen, Adam Klein, Sarah Lacina and Sophie Clarke, where he was the sixth person voted out of the game. He was defeated by Tyson Apostol and Natalie Anderson respectively in the challenges to return from the Edge of Extinction and was sent to the jury for the first time in his career. He voted for Tony Vlachos to win the season, which he did in a 12-4-0 vote, making Vlachos the second two-time Sole Survivor following Diaz-Twine, and the winner of the increased grand prize at $2,000,000.

With this season, Mariano became the first Survivor contestant to play for a fifth time; Mariano once again became the longest-played Survivor contestant in his career, having played a cumulative 152 days (excluding the 37 days in Island of the Idols) over five seasons, surpassing the previous record held by Ozzy Lusth who played 128 over four seasons set in Survivor: Game Changers.

Rob and Amber Get Married 
On April 16, 2005, Mariano and Brkich were married in a private ceremony at Atlantis Paradise Island in the Bahamas. CBS aired a two-hour special about the wedding, Rob and Amber Get Married, on May 24, 2005.

The Amazing Race

Season 7
As an engaged couple, Mariano and his fiancée Amber Brkich participated in the seventh season of The Amazing Race and came in second place. During a Roadblock challenge in Mendoza, Argentina, in the third leg of the race, contestants had to eat four pounds of meat. Mariano began the roadblock but very quickly determined he would not or could not eat that quantity. The penalty for not finishing the Roadblock was a four-hour delay. By convincing several other contestants to refuse to participate, he ensured that several contestants were on the same timetable as he and Brkich. Also in South America, Mariano pooled his money with some other racers to bribe the bus driver into letting the teams that contributed off earlier. When Rob bribed the driver, he used none of his own money.

In Botswana, during the sixth leg of the race, the couple was criticized by fellow racers, as well as host Phil Keoghan, when they drove by the car accident of another team, brothers Brian and Greg, without stopping. Their fellow competitors all checked in with the brothers prior to continuing on to the next stage of the race. In southern Africa, Mariano and Brkich saw their own photo on a magazine cover.

Mariano and Brkich ultimately finished in second place behind married couple, Uchenna and Joyce. Amongst fans, there has been much speculation surrounding the final leg of the race. It has been argued that the production crew had intervened with the airport authorities and aided Uchenna and Joyce onto the same, earlier plane as Mariano and Brkich. In the "Revisiting the Race" special feature on the Season 7 DVD, Mariano, along with Uchenna and Keoghan denied these accusations. Mariano describes Uchenna running around frantically trying to get onto the flight, which the final edited version of the show does not portray. Keoghan cites the fact that the decision to re-open the door rested solely with the pilot, and that intervention by the production crew would have resulted in someone leaking such information out. Although Mariano and Brkich lost the one million dollar grand prize and "The Amazing Race 7" winners' title at the final leg of the race, they managed to place 1st in the 2nd, 4th, 7th, and 10th legs. They were also the only team to not come in last place on any legs of the race.

All-Stars
The Marianos later competed in the All-Stars season of The Amazing Race, which began airing in February 2007. The couple's racing status was listed as "newlyweds". While they had set a record for The Amazing Race, coming in first place for the first three legs, they were eliminated on the fourth leg of the race.

Additional television appearances
In 2004, Mariano was the narrator/player operator of a short-lived reality series on UPN titled The Player. The show aired 8 episodes from August 4 to September 15.

On April 16, 2005, Mariano and Brkich were married in a private ceremony in the Bahamas. CBS aired Rob and Amber Get Married, a two-hour special about the wedding, on May 24, 2005.

Mariano was a co-host of the six-week Sci Fi series, Sci Fi Investigates. The show investigates subjects such as Bigfoot, Mothman, Paranormal Hotspots, Roswell, The Afterlife and Voodoo.

Between their two appearances on The Amazing Race, Mariano and Brkich filmed a 10-episode show for the Fox Reality Channel, Rob and Amber: Against the Odds in 2006, which aired the following year. Set in Las Vegas, the program follows Mariano's attempts to become a professional poker player and features professional player Daniel Negreanu tutoring him. The series ended with Rob and Amber Mariano accepting an offer to appear on The Amazing Race: All-Stars and the odds of Rob's professional poker career waned.

In 2008, Mariano appeared in an episode of Canadian show, Reality Obsessed, hosted by Murtz Jaffer and won first place in a competition that pitted him against James Zinkand (Big Brother 9 (US)), Jen Parker (The Amazing Race 12), and Jennifer Hoffman (The Apprentice). The episode, "The Reality All-Stars Game", aired on November 19.

Mariano was co-host on The History Channel's Around the World in 80 Ways which ran from October to December 2011.

In 2016, Mariano appeared in a special episode of The Price Is Right which featured multiple former Survivor contestants competing on the show. The episode aired on May 23, 2016.

In 2022, Mariano is on Season 2 Secret Celebrity Renovation, where he and his company help restore houses for various celebrities.

Filmography

Television

References

External links
 
 Rob Mariano biography for Survivor: Marquesas at CBS.com
 Rob Mariano biography for Survivor: All-Stars at CBS.com
 Rob Mariano biography for Survivor: Heroes vs. Villains at CBS.com
 Rob Mariano biography for Survivor: Redemption Island at CBS.com

1975 births
American people of Italian descent
American people of Puerto Rican descent
20th-century Roman Catholics
21st-century Roman Catholics
Catholics from Massachusetts
Winners in the Survivor franchise
Boston University College of Arts and Sciences alumni
Living people
People from Canton, Massachusetts
People from Pensacola, Florida
Survivor (American TV series) winners
The Amazing Race (American TV series) contestants
Xaverian Brothers High School alumni
People from Hyde Park, Boston